Malamorenò is the second album released by the Italian singer Arisa, it features the single "Malamorenò".

Track list

Charts

References 

2010 albums
Arisa albums
Warner Music Group albums
Italian-language albums